Liaquat Ali Choudhury (Liakot Ali Choudhuri) is a Bangladeshi diplomat and former High Commissioner to India.

References

Year of birth missing (living people)
Living people
Bangladeshi diplomats
High Commissioners of Bangladesh to India